John Hobart Caradoc, 2nd Baron Howden GCB KH (1799–1873), was Minister Plenipotentiary in the British Embassy at Madrid, Spain, 1850–1858.

Family
John Hobart Caradoc was the son of General John Cradock, 1st Baron Howden, GCB (11 August 1759 – 26 July 1839), a British peer, (1st Baron Howden since 1819) in the Peerage of Ireland and since 1831 in the Peerage of the United Kingdom. He was a politician and soldier instrumental in the 1798 battle of Vinegar Hill, Enniscorthy, County of Wexford, within what is known as the Irish Rebellion. He was, between other things, Governor of the Cape Colony, 1811–1814.

John Hobart Caradoc was therefore, the grandson of John Cradock (1708? – 1778), alias Craddock, Church of Ireland Archbishop of Dublin from 1772, the Irish branch of the Protestant Church of England, nowadays. His accepted family name changed thus in two generations from Craddock to Cradock and then to Caradoc.

He married Princess Catherine Bagration, née Countess Skavronskaya in 1830. The union was childless and the couple separated.

Career
He served in parliament as M.P. for Dundalk in 1830–31.

He had been appointed as a liaison officer of the British Army during the siege of the Belgian Antwerp citadel by the French Northern Army of Marshall Gérard end of 1832. For his services he had been made an officer in the Belgian order of Leopold on 10 March 1833 and a commander in 1852.

Honours 
 Commander of the Order of Leopold.

See also
Baron Howden

References
http://www.abitofhistory.net/html/rhw/body_files/b_body.htm. A very short sketch on the life of former Mrs. Bagration, a widow since 1812, née Skavronsky, (1783–1857), who married in 1830, 47, 15 years younger John Hobart Caradoc, 2nd Baron Howden, title inherited, and extinct at his death in 1873, no issue, since 1839.
http://www.bodley.ox.ac.uk/dept/scwmss/wmss/online/1500-1900/howden/howden000.html. This document is entitled: "Catalogue of papers of John Francis Cradock (later Caradoc), 1st Baron Howden, and of his son, John Hobart Caradoc, 2nd Baron Howden, 1806-58", Bodleian Library, University of Oxford
Alexander Mikaberidze, "The Lion of the Russian Army: Life and Military Career of Prince General Peter Bagration", 2 volumes, (doct. diss., Florida State University, 2003).
http://www.napoleon-series.org/research/biographies/bagration/c_bagration1.html . A page by Alexander MIKABERIDZE, Chairman of the Napoleonic Society of Georgia, mentioned above.

Specific

External links 
 

1799 births
1873 deaths
Ambassadors of the United Kingdom of Great Britain and Ireland to Spain
Members of the Parliament of the United Kingdom for County Louth constituencies (1801–1922)
UK MPs 1830–1831
UK MPs who inherited peerages
Barons in the Peerage of Ireland
Barons in the Peerage of the United Kingdom
Eldest sons of British hereditary barons
Knights Grand Cross of the Order of the Bath
Recipients of the Order of St. Anna, 2nd class
Recipients of the Legion of Honour
Whig (British political party) MPs for Irish constituencies